The PCC-Stadion is a football stadium in Homberg (Duisburg), North Rhine-Westphalia, Germany. It is the home ground of the women's Bundesliga side MSV Duisburg—continuing the tradition of the FCR 2001 Duisburg—and men's fourth division side VfB Homberg. 

The stadium has a capacity of 3,000. The main stand has 800 covered seats. The name of the ground comes from PCC SE, a local industrial company and sponsor of the stadium since its construction in 2003.

References

Buildings and structures in Duisburg
Football venues in Germany
FCR 2001 Duisburg
MSV Duisburg
Sports venues in North Rhine-Westphalia